The Mercedes-Benz Sprinter is a light commercial vehicle (van) built by Mercedes-Benz Group AG of Stuttgart, Germany as a large van, chassis cab, minibus, and pickup truck. In the past, the Sprinter had been sold under the Mercedes-Benz, Dodge, and Freightliner nameplates. In the U.S., it was built from complete knock down (CKD) kits by Freightliner. Re-badged and re-engined Sprinters were also sold by Volkswagen Commercial Vehicles as the Volkswagen LT and the Volkswagen Crafter. They are now primarily marketed by Mercedes-Benz.

In the Mercedes-Benz van lineup, the Sprinter is the largest model offered, followed by the mid-size Vito (aka Viano, V-Class, and EQV) and small Citan.



First generation (1995–2006, T1N)

Europe
The first generation Sprinter was launched in Europe in 1995 to replace the famous but outdated T1 Transporter van dating from 1977. Compared to the T1, the Sprinter had reduced the aerodynamic drag and moved the engine  further forward to increase cabin space. It was the first Mercedes-Benz product to carry a name rather than an alphanumeric designation. The Sprinter was voted International Van of the Year for 1995.

The styling was updated in 2000 and 2002, accompanied by technical changes that included standard electronic stability control (2002).

North America

The first generation (VA Chassis) North American Sprinter was launched in 2001 in the U.S. and was originally branded as a Freightliner. Units sold to the rest of North America were badged as Mercedes-Benz until 2003 when they received Dodge branding. Rather than redesign the aging Dodge Ram Van which had used the same basic body and layout since the 1970s, DaimlerChrysler chose to discontinue the Ram Van in 2003 and offer the Sprinter instead for the North American market. It was available exclusively with the inline-5 diesel engine and a 5-speed automatic transmission. The Dodge and Freightliner Sprinters were identical except for minor styling details and badging. Units in the United States and Canada, but not in Mexico, could be purchased as a Dodge or Freightliner from 2003.

The product was launched and supported by DaimlerChrysler Vans LLC, a small division based in Huntersville, North Carolina. Key individuals from DaimlerChrysler Commercial Vehicle Division and Freightliner Trucks were selected to spearhead the effort and made up the bulk of the division. DaimlerChrysler Vans LLC retained sole responsibility for the North American Sprinter market until the sales, service and parts support responsibilities were absorbed by Chrysler Commercial Vehicle Division in 2004. Nearly all of the original staff were retained, though the base of operations shifted from North Carolina to Auburn Hills, Michigan. The remainder of DaimlerChrysler Vans LLC remained active in Huntersville as an engineering, upfitter certification and safety compliance resource in support of the Sprinter.

From 2001 to 2006, cargo versions of the Sprinter were manufactured in Düsseldorf, Germany, partially disassembled and shipped to a Freightliner factory in Gaffney, South Carolina where they were reassembled. The cargo versions, classified as light trucks, are subject to the 25% chicken tax if imported as a complete unit, which is avoided by the disassembly and importation as a semi knock-down kit, with subsequent reassembly in America. Passenger vans were not subject to the same tax classifications and were imported as an assembled unit through Mercedes-Benz in Jacksonville, Florida.

Japan
The Sprinter van was sold as the Mercedes-Benz Transporter T1N due to Toyota using the name Toyota Sprinter, a version of the Corolla.

Iran
The model 314 of the first generation is still assembled by Iran Khodro Diesel. It is used as an ambulance.

Vietnam
The first generation Sprinter was assembled by Mercedes Benz Vietnam in Ho Chi Minh City from CKD kits to avoid high local import duties.

Sprinter Classic
Since 2013, the 2000–2006 Sprinter model has been revived in Russian markets only as the Mercedes-Benz Sprinter Classic. The phase 2 2002–2006 grille was chosen for use on the Sprinter Classic and the 2000–2006 dashboard design. Sprinter Classic used the steering wheel from the 2006–2014 Sprinter models. The Sprinter Classic is built by the Gorky Automobile Plant at Nizhny Novgorod for service in Russian/Eastern European markets only.

Engines

Dimensions

Notes

Fuel economy

Second generation (2006–2018, NCV3)

Initial release

The second generation Sprinter was introduced in Europe in 2006. It was voted Van of the Year 2007 and again in 2008 by Professional Van and Light Truck Magazine.
2012 Information and Fuel Consumption Figures.

Also known as the NCV3 or New Concept Van 3, the second generation Sprinter appeared in Europe and in other countries as the 2006 model year. North America received its own NCV3 for the 2007 model year.

The US cargo version of the 906 NCV3 comes in two wheelbase options (144", 170"), two roof heights (standard 60.6", high 72.4"), three lengths (Short 233.3", Standard 274.2, Extended 289.8"), and two weight classes (2500, 3500). 3500 models have the option of dual rear wheels or extra-wide "super single" wheels in some, but not all, markets. Neither the 128" wheelbase nor the rear super single tires are available in the United States market. The US cargo version are reassembled from kits in an assembly plant located in Ladson, South Carolina, while the passenger models are imported directly from Germany.

The second-generation 906 was produced in Argentina only for export markets—except Mercosur markets (Brazil, Uruguay and Paraguay)—from 2007 until 2010, but in 2011 announced new production of the second generation in the Centro Industrial J. Manuel Fangio, in Buenos Aires with the brand new OM 651 engine (also local made) and exported to the rest of America (including Mercosur markets). Since 2012, it is manufactured for the Mercosur and 40 other countries. 70% of its production is exported.

Production
Mercedes-Benz Sprinter was built in Daimler's Mercedes-Benz Düsseldorf and Ludwigsfelde production plants.

For the second-generation Sprinter marketed in the United States, to avoid "chicken tax" import duties, the cargo version was disassembled partially, shipped to the United States, and reassembled at a plant in Ladson, South Carolina (near North Charleston), in a process known as semi knock-down assembly (SKD), starting in June 2006; the passenger version continued to be imported as a complete unit. The Ladson factory previously was used as an American LaFrance factory for firefighting trucks. The previous SKD reassembly facility in Gaffney resumed operations under Freightliner Custom Chassis Corporation. The Ladson plant was known as DaimlerChrysler Manufacturing International until the parent corporation was dissolved; importation and SKD reassembly of the Sprinter cargo van continued at Ladson under the auspices of Mercedes-Benz Vans, LLC.

Between July 2013 and the end of May 2014, Mercedes-Benz Vans sold around 134,000 units of the new model of Mercedes-Benz Sprinter in Europe and North America.

The production version of the Mercedes-Benz Sprinter-based Volkswagen Crafter by Mercedes-Benz Vans was set to end in 2016.

A class action lawsuit was filed in California state court against Mercedes-Benz alleging the defendant has sold Mercedes-Benz Sprinter models 2500 and 3500 with water that leaked from the roof air conditioning unit into the passenger area. The leaking air conditioning unit was also discovered on Dodge Sprinters made by Mercedes-Benz from 2003 through 2009. The lawsuit affected California residents with the rooftop AC units and Sprinters equipped with the rear AC.

Algeria
From 2014 Algeria started manufacturing the latest model of sprinter Sprinter 319/519 4x2 and 4x4 for civilian and military use.

Marketing
Mercedes-Benz Sprinter vans were used in the Boost by Mercedes-Benz custom transportation program.

Updates

Sprinter (2013–2019)
The second generation Sprinter was updated in 2013 with changes including the addition of new assistance systems (crosswind stabilization, collision avoidance system (optional), blind spot monitor (optional), adaptive highbeam, lane departure warning system), Euro VI emissions compliance, redesigned radiator grille, more angular headlights, new upholstery and seat coverings, thicker steering wheel, optional fresh air nozzles boast chrome applications, new-generation radio system.

The vehicle was unveiled in 2014 International Commercial Vehicles show.

Ordering began in June 2013, followed by deliveries in September 2013. Early models include ECO-Gear six-speed manual transmission or the 7G-TRONIC PLUS seven-speed automatic transmission with lock-up clutch.

US models went on sale in the fall of 2013 as 2014 model year vehicles. Early models included a choice of 2 engines (2.1-liter 4-cylinder turbo diesel (163PS) with 7-speed automatic, 3.0-liter V6 turbo diesel (190PS) with 5-speed automatic), 144" & 170" wheelbase (both engines), 3 body lengths, high-roof option, 5 configurations (Cargo, Crew, Passenger, MiniBus, Cab Chassis).

In September 2018, e-commerce platform Amazon announced that they had contracted to acquire 20,000 Amazon-badged Sprinters to be available for small business partners of their proprietary logistics service.

Sprinter 4x4 (2015–2019) 

Early models include Sprinter 313/513 BlueTec 4x4, Sprinter 316/516 BlueTec 4x4, Sprinter 319/519 BlueTec 4x4; Eco Gear six-speed manual or five-speed automatic (transmission with converter Sprinter 319/519 BlueTec 4x4).

US models were set to go on sale in the first quarter of 2015 as 2015 model year vehicles. Early models included 144" and 170" wheelbases in low and high roof configurations, 5 body styles (Passenger Van, Crew Van (mixed 2-row passenger and cargo application), and Cargo Van (both 8,550 and 11,030 GVWRs)), 1 engine choice (3.0 L V6 BlueTEC (exclusive 4x4 powertrain)).

2014 facelift

For the 2014 model year the Sprinter received an updated grille with Mercedes' signature three-slat design. In an effort to make the Sprinter's fuel economy more competitive, North American models received the 2.1L OM651 two-stage turbo diesel engine formerly only available overseas, with an optional 3.0L engine. The 2.1L engine (in Europe also the 3.0 L) was mated to a new 7 speed automatic transmission. A 1.8 L supercharged I-4 gasoline engine was mated to 6- and 7- speed automatic transmissions. The 2014 Sprinter added several new driver assistance technologies including standard Crosswind Assist, optional Blind Spot Assist and Collision Prevention Assist, as well as Lane Keeping Assist and Highbeam Assist. The 2014 Sprinter began offering LED running lights. Air suspension was an available option on the 3500-series model. The 2014 Sprinter also gained navigation, iPod integration, and an air suspension for heavier-duty models.

20th Anniversary Edition
For the UK market in 2015, to celebrate 20 years since the first Sprinters were manufactured a run of 1200 special edition vans were sold to the public. These vans included the following additional interior comforts and exterior trim level;
 Air Conditioning
 Integrated Satellite navigation
 Drivers comfort seat & armrest
 Wheel Trims
 Chrome Grille
 Chrome 'Sprinter 20' badging on the front wing

Engines

Dimensions

Notes

Third generation (2019–present, VS30) 

The third-generation Sprinter debuted on 6 February 2018 at the Mercedes-Benz logistics center in Duisburg and was available to purchase from June 2018. It is the first generation to include a front-wheel-drive van in the line-up. A new range of standard and optional technology and comfort features were made available.

To prepare for the third-generation van, in 2015, Mercedes-Benz Vans decided to switch North American Sprinter production to complete knock-down kit (CKD) assembly, kicking off an expansion of the Ladson factory in 2016, and the first Ladson-built Sprinter rolled off the assembly line in September 2018. The Freightliner version was discontinued after the 2021 model year as part of the Daimler Truck divestment in the Freightliner brand in October 2021.

The third generation Sprinter was updated for the 2023 model year in the U.S., offering a new, all-time all-wheel-drive option with retirement of the selectable "4x4" option; additionally, a 2 liter 4-cylinder OM654 engine replaced the previous diesel engines with a standard and high output tunings offered. Power steering was updated to electromechanical from hydraulic.

eSprinter

The first eSprinter was announced in February 2018. It is a large battery-electric van based on the third-generation Sprinter with a unique front-wheel drive chassis; production of the eSprinter commenced at Düsseldorf in December 2019 for European markets.

eSprinter 2.0
One year after eSprinter production started, Mercedes-Benz announced its successor in December 2020. The second-generation eSprinter 2.0 will be released in late 2023. It is based on the Mercedes-Benz "Electric Versatility Platform" (EVP), a bespoke chassis designed for large vans; EVP shifts the traction motor to the rear axle and enables Mercedes-Benz to offer variants, including pickup truck, chassis cab, and cutaway versions. Three different battery capacities will be available, as Mercedes is aiming to double the range of the Europe-only first generation eSprinter. Production is scheduled to start in the second half of 2023 at the three Sprinter factories: Ladson; Düsseldorf; and Ludwigsfelde.

Dimensions

Notes

Uses
The Sprinter is designed primarily for business, not private users, although recreational vehicle (RV) conversions are available. In the United States, the first generation Sprinters (2001–2006) were offered solely with the Mercedes-Benz 2.7 litre straight 5 cylinder turbocharged Diesel.

Companies are replacing van conversions with wide bus bodies—Sprinters with side-facing benches and tall right-side doors—as campus shuttles. Limited numbers of complete "wagons" (passenger vans) are being produced in Germany and shipped complete to the United States mostly for personal and church van uses. Typical Sprinter Wagons accommodate 8 to 10 passengers and have glass in all possible factory positions. Vans shipped to the United States on-spec (speculation to sell by dealer/distributor) are mostly sent in Arctic White color, but many colors are available. The Dodge dealer network for Sprinters is limited to certified locations (known as "Business Link" certified dealers, usually only awarded to "Five Star" certified dealers), and dealer knowledge is still limited in both sales and service. Special orders typically take one to three months for delivery, and may take even longer due to the assembly and disassembly in Germany, and exporting parts to South Carolina for re-assembly. The exception is passenger van models which are assembled in Germany and exported as complete vehicles. This is because of the United States Chicken Tax. As an unintended consequence, several importers of light trucks have circumvented the tariff via loopholes, known as tariff engineering. Ford (ostensibly a company that the tax was designed to protect), imported its first-generation Transit Connect light trucks as "passenger vehicles" to the U.S. from Turkey, and immediately stripped and shredded portions of their interiors (e.g., installed rear seats, seatbelts) in a warehouse outside Baltimore. To import vans built in Germany, Mercedes "disassembled them and shipped the pieces to South Carolina, where American workers put them back together in a small kit assembly building." The resulting vehicles emerge as locally manufactured, free from the tariff.

In North America, most Sprinters are sold as cargo vans to expediters in the United States. Such expediters are similar to truck drivers, except they take smaller loads and will wait after unloading until dispatchers find another customer nearby to transport goods. The advent of the Sprinter van with its cargo space of  has allowed van expediters to take three  skids or pallets, where previously they were limited to a capacity of two pallets.
The vehicle has been adopted by the police in Hong Kong, United Kingdom and in Poland, also and as an ambulance by countries in Western Europe, Scandinavia, the US, Australia and New Zealand. The 515 CDI has become the standard ambulance for use by the National Health Service (NHS) in the United Kingdom, and the Health Service Executive (HSE) in the Republic of Ireland.

Another market in which Sprinters are gaining ground is as van conversions and recreational vehicles. Conversions include RVs, limousines, family and luxury vans, office vans, wheelchair accessible vans and golf vans. Sprinter RV conversions can also be called Sprinter campervans. Sprinter conversions have been produced by several RV and coach manufacturers. Chilled box versions of the Sprinter currently make up the majority of the supermarket Home Delivery fleet across the UK, but demand for these vans has begun to decline. ASDA recently announced that its new fleet would be primarily custom IVECO vans, following in the footsteps of Tesco. Mercedes are currently working with Waitrose Home Delivery, who currently use chilled LWB HR Sprinters, on a prototype of a new generation home-delivery van, which is currently being used in select stores, aiming to cut emissions, costs and increase time efficiency.

Sprinters have been used globally as television production vehicles, most commonly as ENG (Electronic News Gathering) and SNG (Satellite News Gathering) vehicles. These are a popular choice for local affiliates for their maneuverability in metropolitan areas and the lack of DOT regulations (in the under 10,000 lbs versions).

Despite not being marketed as a family vehicle, a custom-modified Dodge-branded Sprinter was used by the ten-member Gosselin family, the subjects of the TLC reality series Jon & Kate Plus 8.

In Colombia, the Sprinter is the most popular van for intercity transport. The purchase of a luxuriously appointed Sprinter by the son of former President Julio Cesar Turbay, Julio Cesar Turbay, Jr. prompted a scandal.

A Mercedes Sprinter was the vehicle used by Mike and Frank on the History Channel reality series American Pickers until Season 6, when it was replaced by a Ford Transit.

The van is also used as a mobile command center by the Garda Síochána which is the national police force of the Republic of Ireland.

A chassis of the Sprinter is also expected to be used for the upcoming Astrovan II which will be made by Airstream to transport Boeing commercial crew astronauts to Cape Canaveral Space Launch Complex 41 where they would board the CST-100 Starliner on their way to the International Space Station.

Passenger minibuses
Although primarily marketed as a goods van, the Sprinter has 5 variants designed to carry passengers. These are made by removing parts of the walls and replacing them with glass window panels.

Sprinter Mobility

This is the smallest of the Sprinter minibuses. There are 4 sub-variants: the 23, 33, 35 and 45. It has 8-18 seats and is 6.9-7.4 metres long. It has 4 doors: 1 on either side of the driver and front passenger seats (which, like in a van, are segregated from the main passenger compartment), a sliding door in the middle, which goes into the rear passenger seating area, and a set of double doors at the back going into the disabled area with an elevator that can be extended out of the doors when they are open.

It is designed for paratransit.

Sprinter Transfer
This minibus is a longer variant of the Sprinter Mobility where the front passenger seat has been removed and the front passenger seat door now acts as the door for all passengers. In addition, the back wall has seats along it, but can be opened as a door and the seats removed to make modifications to the interior of the vehicle. It comes in 5 sub-variants: 23, 34, 35, 45 and 55. It has 13-22 seats and is 5.9-7.7 metres long.

It is designed for bus services to hamlets.

Sprinter Travel
This bus has a high-floor, and in addition to the driver's door, has just 1 automatic passenger door with steps. It is 7.4-7.7 metres long and has 17-19 seats.

It is marketed as a mini-coach.

Sprinter Inkanyezi
The Sprinter Inkanyezi is marketed in South Africa from 2020s onward as minibus taxi fleet in the country. The car is powered by a 2.0-litre, four-cylinder turbocharged diesel engine and can carry 23 passengers.

Sprinter City

The Mercedes-Benz Sprinter City minibus variant has been in production since 1995 and is marketed through EvoBus. The Freightliner variant has been in production since 2007. There are three sizes, Sprinter City 35, 65 and 77, which seat from 10 to 16 passengers; including standing passengers, these versions can accommodate 22 to 40 passengers. The 77 variant has a low floor throughout and a third pair of wheels at the rear. The Sprinter City has two automatic doors: a set of double doors at the front, used for passengers getting on or off and having a disabled ramp; and a single door behind the rear wheel for passengers alighting, which opens off some stairs in the high-floor area. There is also a manual door on the offside into the driver's cab. The 77 variant has double rear doors.

Engines

For engine choices, the Sprinter is currently offered with inline four and V6 diesel engines; V6 petrol/gasoline; or liquefied petroleum gas (LPG) engines in Europe, Asia, Australia, and South America. In North America, only the six-cylinder 3.0 L turbodiesel and 4-cylinder 2.1 L turbo diesel engines are offered. The Maxion/Rover HSD diesel engine was offered in Brazil from 1998 to 2002 with the 2,5lt. The versions are 310D with 95PS (Turbo Diesel) and 312D, with 115PS (Turbo Diesel Intercooler).

An electric hybrid version has been tested, but is not currently officially part of the Sprinter range. 2,000 electric Sprinters are to be made by VDL Groep from 2016.

2000–2006 (2002–2006 USA)

2006–present (2007–2010 USA)

The Sprinter is also available as the 316/416/516 NGT – Compressed Natural Gas (CNG).

References

Notes

Bibliography

External links

 Official Mercedes-Benz UK Sprinter Van webpage
 Mercedes-Benz Sprinter USA website
 Freightliner Sprinter USA website
Press kit:
 The new Mercedes-Benz Sprinter

Sprinter
Vehicles introduced in 1995
Police vehicles
Minibuses
Vans
Electric vans
Low-floor buses
Rear-wheel-drive vehicles
Hybrid vans
1990s cars
2000s cars
2010s cars